Khokababur Pratyabartan (English: The Return of Little Master) is a 1960 Indian Bengali-language social drama film directed by Agradoot based on the 1891 short story of the same name by Rabindranath Tagore. The film starring Uttam Kumar in lead with Asit Baran, Sumita Sanyal and others are played supporting role. This film was released on 28 April 1960 under the banner of Agradoot Chitra. Music direction of the film was done by Hemanta Mukherjee. The film is remember as one of the best film of Uttam's career. His performance as a servant was huge acclaimed. The film was an hit at the box office.

Plot
The plot revolves with Raicharan's tragic life. He is the obedient servant of local zamindar and takes care of zamindar's son whom he addresses as Khokababu. One day, the little son dies in an accident in river flood and he is blamed for the same. In a delusional state, Raicharan starts believing his own infant to be his much loved khokababu and brought him up only to return him to his master.

Cast
 Uttam Kumar as Raicharan
 Tulsi Chakraborty
 Sumita Sanyal as Raicharan's Wife
 Asit Baran as Anukul
 Jahar Ganguly as Raicharan's Father
 Shobha Sen as Raicharan's Sister
 Sisir Batabyal
 Dipti Ray
 Master Babu as Khokababu
 Tilak Chakraborty

Soundtrack

Only Rabindra Sangeet used in this film to help by Rabindra Bharati.

Reception
This is one of the best film of Uttam Kumar's career. For the first time he doing character actor role. In the film he was totally deglamouraized. His performance as a servant Raicharan was huge acclaimed.  

In a article of Times of India wrote that - "Want to discover Mahanayak’s unmatched acting skills beyond romantic hits? You have to watch ‘Khokababur Pratyabartan’. It’s not an easy task for a charismatic lead actor to jump into the role of a next door loyal servant. Because of the screen adaptation of a famous story of Rabindranath Tagore, it was more difficult to maintain the authentic feel of the story. Uttam Kumar excelled it so well that it is still regarded as one of the most touching Bengali films ever created." 

The film become hit at the box office. It's also remembered as the first successful film based on Rabindranath Tagore story. 

This film was also remembered as  the very first successful film based on Rabindranath Tagore story.

Notes

References

External links
 

1960 films
Bengali-language Indian films
Films based on short fiction
Indian drama films
Films based on works by Rabindranath Tagore
Films directed by Agradoot
1960s Bengali-language films